Meza elba, the light brown missile, is a butterfly in the family Hesperiidae. It is found in Guinea, Sierra Leone, Ivory Coast, Ghana, Nigeria, Cameroon and the Republic of the Congo.

References

Butterflies described in 1937
Erionotini